The EMD 710 is a line of diesel engines built by Electro-Motive Diesel (previously General Motors' Electro-Motive Division). The 710 series replaced the earlier EMD 645 series when the 645F series proved to be unreliable in the early 1980s 50-series locomotives which featured a maximum engine speed of 950 rpm. The EMD 710 is a relatively large medium-speed two-stroke diesel engine that has  displacement per cylinder, and a maximum engine speed of 900 rpm.

In 1951, E. W. Kettering wrote a paper for the ASME entitled, History and Development of the 567 Series General Motors Locomotive Engine, which goes into great detail about the technical obstacles that were encountered during the development of the 567 engine. These same considerations apply to the 645 and 710, as these engines were a development of the 567C, applying a cylinder bore increase (645) and a stroke increase (710), to achieve a greater power output, without changing the external size or weight of the engines, thereby achieving significant improvements in horsepower per unit volume and horsepower per unit weight.

Since its introduction, EMD has continually upgraded the 710G diesel engine.

The 710 has proved to be exceptionally reliable, but the earlier 645 is still supported and most 645 service parts are still in new production, as many 645E-powered GP40-2 and SD40-2 locomotives are still operating after four decades of service, and these often serve as a benchmark for engine reliability, which the 710 would meet and eventually exceed, and quite a number of non-SD40-2 locomotives (SD40, SD45, SD40T-2, and SD45T-2, for example, and even some SD50s), have been rebuilt to the equivalent of SD40-2s with new or remanufactured engines and other subsystems, using salvaged locomotives as a starting point. Some of these rebuilds have been made using new 12-cylinder 710 engines in place of the original 16-cylinder 645 engines, retaining the nominal rating of 3000 horsepower, but with lower fuel consumption.

Over the production span of certain locomotive models, upgraded engine models have been fitted when these became available. For example, an early 1994-built SD70MAC had a 16-710G3B, whereas a later 2003-built SD70MAC would have a 16-710G3C-T1.

The engine is made in V8, V12, V16, and V20 configurations, although most current locomotive production is the V16 engine, whereas most current marine and stationary engine production is the V20 engine.

Specifications 
All 710 engines are two-stroke 45° V engines. The 710 model was introduced in 1985 and has a  longer stroke (now ) than the 645 ( stroke). The engine is uniflow scavenged with four poppet exhaust valves in the cylinder head. For maintenance, a power assembly, consisting of a cylinder head, cylinder liner, piston, piston carrier, and piston rod can be individually and relatively easily and quickly replaced. The block is made from flat, formed, and rolled structural steel members and steel forgings welded into a single structure (a "weldment"). Blocks may, therefore, be easily repaired, if required, using conventional shop tools. Each bank of cylinders has a camshaft which operates the exhaust valves and the unit injectors.

Pre-1995 engines have mechanically controlled unit injectors (UIs), patented in 1934 by General Motors, EMD's former owner. Post-1995 engines have electronic unit injectors (EUIs) which fit within the same space as a mechanical unit injector. The use of EUI is EMD's implementation of non-common-rail electronic fuel injection on its large-displacement diesel engines.

See EMD 645 for general specifications common to all 567, 645, and 710 engines.

Unlike the 567 or 645, which could use either Roots blowers or a turbocharger, the 710 engine is only offered with turbocharging. The turbocharger is gear-driven and has a centrifugal clutch that allows it to act as a centrifugal blower at low engine speeds (when exhaust gas flow and temperature alone are insufficient to drive the turbine) and a purely exhaust-driven turbocharger at higher speeds. The turbocharger can revert to acting as a supercharger during demands for large increases in engine output power. While more expensive to maintain than Roots blowers, EMD claims that this design allows "significantly" reduced fuel consumption and emissions, improved high-altitude performance, and even up to a 50 percent increase in maximum rated horsepower over Roots-blown engines for the same engine displacement. But, unlike the earlier 645 and 567, which could use either turbochargers or Roots blowers, EMD's clutched turbocharger is an integral part of most 710 models.

Forced induction effectively eliminates this derating.

Some 710 engines have been converted to, or even delivered as, Roots-blown engines with conventional exhaust-driven turbochargers. Others have received modifications that permit lower fuel consumption (but possibly at the expense of higher NOx emissions or reduced power output), lower emissions, or even higher power (at the expense of increased fuel consumption).

Rail versions

Stationary/marine versions

Like most EMD engines, the 710 is also sold for stationary and marine applications.

Stationary and marine installations are available with either a left or right-hand rotating engine.

Marine engines differ from railroad and stationary engines mainly in the shape and depth of the engine's oil sump, which has been altered to accommodate the rolling and pitching motions encountered in marine applications.

Engine Speed
Full . . . . . . . . . . . . . . 900 RPM
Idle . . . . . . . . . . . . . . 350 RPM
Compression Ratio . . 16:1

Brake Horsepower (ABS Rating)
Model 710G7 Engines
8-cylinder:            1800
12-cylinder:           2800
16-cylinder:           3600
20-cylinder:           4300

See also 
EMD 567
EMD 645
EMD 1010

References 
Notes

Specific

General

External links 
 List of engines under Tier 0, I, and II standards
 SD70 engines (See bottom.)
 
 EMD 710 engine A 16-710G is shown; turbocharged 567 and 645 engines appear similarly. Whether 710, 645 or 567, these engines have the same external dimensions, with the possible exception of accessories.

Two-stroke diesel engines
Diesel locomotive engines
Marine diesel engines
V8 engines